The DDA Siri Fort Sport Complex is a sports stadium in New Delhi, India. It was built for the 1982 Asian Games, next to the Asian Games village by the Delhi Development Authority (DDA), which also runs the facility now. Also close by is the Siri Fort Auditorium complex.

Sports
Basketball, Swimming Pool, Squash, Pitch and Putt Golf, Billiards, Snooker, Shooting, Skating, Tennis, Badminton Courts, Yoga, Aerobics, Gym, Calisthenics, Football, Cricket, Jogging track etc.

2010 Commonwealth Games
The stadium hosted badminton and squash for the Games. The stadium for badminton will have five match courts and three warm-up courts, and the stadium for squash will have 11 singles courts convertible to five doubles courts.

2014 Thomas & Uber Cup
The 2014 Thomas & Uber Cup was held on 18–25 May 2014 at the Siri Fort Sports Complex, New Delhi. This is the first time India hosted the two cups.

See also
 2010 Commonwealth Games
 2014 Thomas & Uber Cup
 Jawaharlal Nehru Stadium, Delhi

References 

2010 Commonwealth Games venues
Sports venues in Delhi
1982 Asian Games
South Delhi district
Sports venues completed in 1982
Badminton venues
Badminton in India
Squash venues
Buildings and structures in New Delhi
1982 establishments in Delhi
20th-century architecture in India